This is a list of characters in the American animated television series Top Cat. Characters are listed only once, normally under the first applicable subsection in the list; very minor characters are listed with a more regular character with whom they are associated. Characters that appear in only one episode are not listed. This also includes information and characters from the feature film Top Cat: The Movie and the prequel film Top Cat Begins.

Core TV show characters

Top Cat
Top Cat (or simply T.C.) is the yellow-furred, suave, and cheeky-chappy main character of the series. He wears a purple pork pie hat and a matching waistcoat. He often manipulates or tricks others, mainly Officer Dibble, but even his own gang. He does appreciate the effort the gang does for him, but he often takes credit for it.  That said, he is caring toward to the gang and will help one of them if they need it. He also stops Officer Dibble from arresting him by lying to Dibble about how much talent Dibble has.

He is voiced by Arnold Stang in the style of Phil Silvers in the TV show, and by Daws Butler in Yogi's Ark Lark. In most of his modern appearances, he is voiced by Tom Kenny. He also appeared in various Wonderland Sydney commercials in Australia where he was voiced by Keith Scott.

In the film, Top Cat: The Movie, he is again the main protagonist. His voice, by Jason Harris, is clipped and a bit deeper. This version of the character has a romantic interest in Trixie. He also tells his gang that they only steal from people who deserve it. He is framed by Lou Strickland, who uses a robot look-alike to get him arrested, whereupon he is placed in a dog jail.

Top Cat appeared in Jellystone!, voiced by Thomas Lennon.

Benny the Ball
Benny, an indigo-colored cat with a white sports jacket that fastens with a single button at his neck, is T.C.'s right-hand man and a youngest member of the gang; they are best friends. He is diminutive, friendly, overweight, and gullible. But he is also loyal, courageous and mature. His eyes are shown as black dots unlike the other cats who have white sclerae with black pupils. Benny may appear to be slow-witted, due to the fact that he always gives the game away, but he manages to ask the most logical questions during the gang's action-packed shenanigans. A number of episodes have focused on Benny, including "The Violin Player", "The Unscratchables" and "The Missing Heir". 

Benny the Ball is modeled after his voice actor Maurice Gosfield in the TV series. He was voiced by John Stephenson in Yogi's Ark Lark, Avery Schreiber in Top Cat and the Beverly Hills Cats, and Maurice LaMarche in Harvey Birdman: Attorney at Law.

In the movie, he gets Top Cat and his gang in trouble, and his fandom of fictional musician Lazlo-Lazlo serves to introduce that character. In the film, his arms are slightly shorter, smaller and younger, his voice, by Chris Edgerly, is more pronounced.

Benny appeared in Jellystone!, voiced by C.H. Greenblatt.

Choo-Choo
Choo-Choo (nicknamed Chooch by T.C. and the gang) is mischievous, quick-witted and inspired by T.C. He is a tall pink cat with a white turtleneck and is often depicted with the eyes of a Siamese cat. He lives at the fire house, as seen in the episode "Hawaii Here We Come". Choo-Choo is apparently a very skilled poker player, as stated by Top Cat in the episode "The Golden Fleecing". He had a couple of love interests, as seen in "Choo-Choo's Romance" and "Choo-Choo Goes Gaga-Gaga".

His voice, by Marvin Kaplan in the TV series, is an impression of Woody Allen. Lenny Leonard on The Simpsons is thought by some to be a homage to Choo-Choo.

Choo-Choo also appeared in several Wonderland Sydney commercials in Australia along with Top Cat and was also voiced by Keith Scott.

In the film, his voice, by Jason Harris, is a bit more clipped and higher-pitched. This version of the character spends a lot of time at a bingo hall.

A female version of Choo-Choo appeared in Jellystone!, voiced by Jenny Lorenzo.

Fancy-Fancy
Fancy-Fancy is a devoted follower of Top Cat. He is smooth-talking, attractive, calm, trustworthy, and charming, and is regularly seen chatting up the ladies before leaving them when hearing the trashcan lid call that signals the gang to meet. A cinnamon-brown cat with a white scarf, his look and voice is based on Cary Grant.

He is voiced by John Stephenson in the TV series.

In the film, which features robots as a plot device, he is able to disguise himself as a feminine robot. His voice is clipped and posher than in the TV series. He also has a girlfriend, with whom he has an uneasy relationship. Matthew Piazzi voices him in the movie.

Fancy-Fancy appeared in Jellystone!, voiced by Andrew Frankel.

Spook
Spook, with olive green fur and a torn black tie, is the lovable rogue of the gang. He is a charismatic yet intimidating cat whose vernacular is based on that of a beatnik, inasmuch as he breaks up his sentences by interjecting the word "like" frequently. He is similar to Fancy-Fancy in persona and appearance but appears more arrogant and care-free. Like Choo-Choo, he is a skilled poker player as stated by Top Cat in the episode "The Golden Fleecing".

He is voiced by Leo De Lyon in the TV series.

In the movie, he has a deep voice, his over-use of "like" is altered a bit, and he is a pool hustler. He has his longest speaking role in the movie, when he tells the gang about his friend who may be able to help them break Top Cat out of jail. Benjamin Diskin voices him in the movie.

A female version of Spook appeared in Jellystone!, voiced by Jenny Lorenzo. The character is renamed as Spooky. She is now silent and will only make occasional sounds to communicate. She has also been redesigned to be fatter and taller, with her tie replaced with a similar-looking scarf.

Brain
Brain, an orange cat with a purple T-shirt with a black line, appears as an assistant to Top Cat. Contrary to his name, Brain is the doltish member of the alley gang, and is notorious for being unable to keep a secret. He is also portrayed as stuttering. He also seems to be in charge of the group's money. Despite his apparent idiocy, he can sometimes say something clever, which T.C. instantly rephrases to make it sound like T.C. thought of it himself.

He is voiced by Leo De Lyon in the TV series.

In the movie, his voice, by Jason Harris, is a little deeper, and he is made more dim-witted.

A female version of Brain appeared in Jellystone!, voiced by Georgie Kidder. Unlike the original character, she is smart and apathetic about everything. She now wears a purple T-shirt and a black skirt.

Officer Charlie Dibble
Charlie Dibble is a New York Police Department officer whose beat includes Top Cat's gang's alley. His full name is discovered in the episode "T.C. Minds the Baby" where T.C. and the gang found an abandoned baby and named him Charlie after Officer Dibble. Though he usually resents the gang's presence in the alley, there are times when he respects and loves them. The gang, despite the many times they managed to trick Dibble, respect and care for him as well. During the episode "Dibble's Birthday" where T.C. wanted to sell all Dibble's presents meant for his birthday, the rest of the gang refused to cooperate. They wanted to cheer Dibble up with a birthday party as he was feeling depressed, one of the rare moments in the series the others weren't willing to follow Top Cat's orders. In the end, T.C. has a change of heart and works together with the gang to cheer Dibble up and to give him his presents.

A recurring theme in the series is about Officer Dibble wanting T.C. to clean up the alley and to stay off his police box. Unfortunately for Dibble, his attempts to convince T.C. usually don't yield the results he was looking for, but it never stops him from trying. Dibble's superior is Sergeant Murphy. Dibble is sometimes mocked with variations of his name by T.C., such of Dabble, Drubble, Dribble, and so on. In reference to this character, "Dibble" has been adopted in Manchester, UK as a derogatory slang term for police officers.

He is voiced by Allen Jenkins in the TV series, and John Stephenson in Yogi's Treasure Hunt and Top Cat and the Beverly Hills Cats.

In the film, where he is voiced by Bill Lobley, his lifelong dream is to become the chief of police, and it is revealed that he works overtime at his police work to impress the current chief, who is due to retire. The movie gives various personal details about him, including that his birth date is December 18 (coinciding with that of Lou Strickland), his favorite food is tuna sandwiches, he enjoys fly-fishing, and he keeps a "lucky penny" (which is actually a nickel) in his shoe.

Minor TV characters featuring in the movie

Griswald
Griswald is a bulldog who is sporadically seen in the show, often antagonizing Top Cat and his gang. He was orange but he is mainly white. He is vicious, but also gullible and dim-witted. In his first appearance, Griswald was the pet of the missing Cat-Wallader's scheming butler Chutney. When Griswald finds out that Chutney was going to take his part of the share early after he botched up a piano-based attempt on Benny's life, Griswald attacked Chutney which led to both of them being arrested by Officer Dibble who identified Chutney as Machine Gun Chutney. In his second appearance, Griswald was employed by the police to help Dibble with his beat. He is voiced by Don Messick in the TV series.

In the film, he starts out as an enemy of Top Cat, but is convinced by T.C. that he is, in fact, a cat, which Griswald believes due to his gullible nature. At the end, he is invited to stay with T.C. and become one of the gang. Griswald is voiced by Jason Harris in the UK version of the movie, and by Danny Trejo in the US release.

Lazlo-Lazlo
Lazlo-Lazlo (known as Lazlo-Lozla in the Spanish version) is a janitor-turned-musician. When Officer Dibble bought a record by him, the musical director of Carnegie Hall mistakenly thought it was Benny playing and took in Benny for his talent, before realizing that it wasn't Benny, but the janitor. Before being "discovered" in this manner, Lazlo was told to "stick to your broom" by Top Cat, after asking for advice. Despite being famous now, Lazlo still works by day as the venue's janitor, and cleans up after every show.

In the film, Top Cat and Benny see him again, when the Maharajah comes to watch him perform.

The Maharajah
The Maharajah of Pookajee is a Middle Eastern gentleman, known for giving away rubies as tips, and (in the 2011 movie) is a huge fan of Lazlo-Lazlo.

In the movie, where he is named Peekajoo (a pun on Pikachu from Pokémon) instead of Pookajee (in Mexico his name was translated to "Pocajú"), he helps Lou Strickland build his police robots. He also claims that Lazlo-Lazlo never misses a note and will bet all of his rubies on it. Top Cat instead bets him for his device, the Maharajahton 5000, which can transform into anything (MP3 player, pencil sharpener, suitcase, hair-dryer, etc.), having a plan to ensure Lazlo misses a note.

Police Chief Eugene Prowler
The chief of police at the thirteenth precinct and Dibble's boss.

Mrs. Ball
Benny the Ball's mom appears in some episodes of the TV series and Top Cat Begins. A homely old lady, she remains unaware throughout the movie about T.C.'s criminal activities. She makes some really terrible food but is very caring toward the cats.

She was voiced by Bea Benaderet in the original show and by Lauri Fraser in the 2015 movie.

A.T. Jazz
A newcomer to the street who immediately attempts to take control of the street, thinking himself to be the "Top Cat" and calling himself A.T. Jazz an abbreviation for "All That Jazz". He was voiced by Daws Butler impersonating Jack Oakie.

He also appeared in the 2011 movie with a no-speaking cameo.

Patrick (Pedro) Dibble
The owner of Pedro's Pizza Pallazo and Dibble's cousin. Pedro owns a pizza parlor near Top Cat's alley and has befriended Top Cat's Gang by giving them free pizza (as explained in the episode "Raffeefleas").

Big Gus
A notorious gangster whom Top Cat runs into twice in the original series. He is best known for his attempt to steal "The Hopeless Diamond", a jewel worth $500,000, only to be thwarted by Benny the Ball, who accidentally swallows the jewel.

In the 2011 movie, he helps the gang break Top Cat out of Dog Jail.

Beverly Hills Cats characters

Kitty Glitter
A femme fatale cat of Beverly Hills, who is a golddigger wanting to marry a rich cat, and is only seen in "Top Cat and the Beverly Hills Cats". She was voiced by Teresa Ganzel.

Kitty is a cream-colored pink cat with a white muzzle. Kitty happens to be one of the few feline characters that doesn't have any whiskers - if not the only one. She also has a long tail like many of the other feline characters, though it doesn't appear in most of her earlier scenes. Her natural hair is short and brown, however she wears a blonde wig for most of the movie. When out with Brain - mistaking him for TC - and in the photo given to TC she is seen wearing a blonde wig (with a bride gown when she's with Brain and a red dress with slash in the photo), however by the time she actually meets up with TC at the costume party the wig she is wearing is of a much redder color (with a purple princess ball gown and princess hat with a pair of beautiful purple evening gloves.

Having a rather vain and shallow mindset, Kitty is a rather materialistic character who adores high class society and glamour. However, she constantly mentions she's willing to do anything for love and wants nothing more than a successful husband. Her character is defined by the idea of being gold digger, however based on her commentary and the values of the time she is implied to be something more of an Old Maid. This is supported by her comment about "waiting for years" in reference to being set up with TC, as well as talking about finding love to herself. Though she found Brain to be rather eccentric, ignorant, and causing trouble wherever he went, she was willing to look past it and tolerate the issues that arose; claiming it to be all in the name of love. She appears to take large offense to people lying to her or being mislead, based on how infuriated she becomes when Brain reveals that he isn't TC like she thought or when TC reveals that he is penniless contrary to what she had been told.

She also didn't appear in any media since 1988, but the franchise's fans also remember her.

Amy Vandergelt
Amy Vandergelt is Ms. Gertrude Vandergelt's 16-year-old niece, and the original heir of her fortune. It's not known what happened to her parents. She was presumed missing because Snerdly (the butler of the Vandergelts' mansion) kept her out of sight working at a car wash until Top Cat and the gang rescued her. Later, she made a picnic with the gang and Officer Dibble, who consider her as their best friend. Amy is voiced by Lilly Moon. 

Amy has a pair of triangulated light blue earrings, red lips and a blonde (yellow-auburn)  pixie cut. When she was in the car wash, Amy wears a dark red polo shirt, blue jeans white socks and a pair of brown mini boots. Amy's fancy outfit consists on a light-red sleeveless shirt, a red blazer jacket with fashion shoulder pads, night blue leggings and a pair of light blue ballet flats, with addition of a light blue pearl necklace. 

One of her most known gags in the film was that she sang very badly "Tomorrow", from the 1977 Broadway musical Annie, but later, she sang perfect the last song (named "Who'll Take the Rap For this Rap?"). 

Amy did not appear in any Top Cat media since 1988, and she's one of the most underrated characters in the franchise and also one of the most beloved and known by fans. Fortunately, fans of the franchise did her return in various of their media and fanarts, and in any moment she would be back in official Top Cat media (such as films, specials, games and toys), but somehow she's not appearing in official media, maybe due to the mixed reviews of the critics about the movie Top Cat and the Beverly Hills Cats or because she is a supporting character, when various fans today acclaim the film as the best Top Cat film ever. For that reason, Amy did not appear in the animated 2010s movies Top Cat: The Movie and Top Cat Begins, both movies by Mexican animation studio Ánima Estudios. But maybe soon she would appear again.

Snerdly

Rasputin

Movie characters

These are the main original characters which appear only in the film, Top Cat: The Movie.

Trixie
Trixie is a grey-blue female feline who works for Lou Strickland and his police robots and is Top Cat's crush. After she found out that T.C. is innocent, she decides to help Dibble and free Top Cat.

She is voiced by Melissa Disney.

Lou Strickland
Lou Strickland is a greedy man and is the main antagonist in the film. Despite his ugly look, he claims to be the most handsome person of all time. In a parody of RoboCop, the movie has him creating android robots to replace policy officers, because he thinks humans make mistakes that technology can prevent. He manages to trick Dibble's boss to believe that he is his son in law (even though the police chief hasn't got any children) and manages to get his job through favouritism and also by framing Top Cat. After gaining control of the police department, he decides not to fire Dibble because they share the same birthday, and he needs someone to help activate the robots. Strickland then takes full control over New York City and starts having people arrested for ludicrous crimes (though the reason why he is like this is never explained. All we get is that he likes technology better than everything else). He shows up as a VIP at the Lazlo-Lazlo concert, but gets his tickets stolen by Top Cat. Strickland is eventually defeated by Top Cat and arrested by Officer Dibble.

He was voiced by Jason Harris in the British and Mexican releases of the film and by Rob Schneider in the US version.

Begins characters

These are the main original characters which appear only in the film, Top Cat Begins.

Mr. Big
A feared crime boss alligator, Mr. Big has his hands in every criminal activity and takes a 99% fee from every criminal operating on his turf. Dibble has been trying for a long time to apprehend him, and when Top Cat and Benny steal Mr. Big's diamonds, they end up as important witnesses in the case - prompting Mr. Big to offer $50.000 reward for Top Cat (and 95 cents for Benny) -resulting in a huge manhunt. In the end, Top Cat uses a similar strategy by luring the people on the manhunt into Mr. Big's lair and offering $50.001 for HIS capture.

He is voiced by Darin De Paul.

Bad Dog
Mr. Big's top henchman, a not very bright brown pitbull with anger issues. He leads the manhunt against Top Cat but is easily fooled when Dibble disguises him as a baby. He ends up defeated when T.C. simply hits him with a newspaper saying "BAD DOG!"

He is voiced by Diedrich Bader.

Panther
Mr. Big's henchwoman and femme fatale, a grey-furred kitty in a low-cut dress who speaks in French accent. She speaks little and is generally seen polishing her nails, but is an effective combatant. She ends up seduced by Fancy-Fancy when he starts speaking French to her (even though it is gibberish), though she breaks up with him during the credits.

She is voiced by Marieve Herington.

Rat
A short, rat-like human henchman of Mr. Big. He generally ends up blown up or flattened in every encounter.

He is voiced by Joey D'Auria.

Granny Dibble
Dibble's rather militaristic grandma, who is a sweet lady on the surface, but hoards weapons and ammo and knows how to handle them. Dibble smuggles Top Cat and Benny to her out of town when Mr. Big's goons are looking for them, and she ends up distracting the goons with grenades, hand-to-hand combat and even a tank she has hidden under her shed!

She is voiced by Charlie Adler.

Chief Thumbton
Chief Thumbton is the Chief of Police and Officer Dibble's boss.

He is voiced by Dave Boat.

Furletta Duchat
A blue kitty singer working in Mr. Big's bar, she ends up in possession of the necklace made out of the stolen diamonds. Benny sneaks into her dressing room and steals the jewels back, but ends up accidentally knocking her out with the door - and then having to impersonate her to sing in her stead.

She is voiced by Patty Mattson.

References

Top Cat
Hanna-Barbera characters
Top Cat
Top Cat